Joseph T. Owens (November 8, 1946 – June 9, 2013) was an American football defensive end in the National Football League. He was drafted by the New Orleans Saints in the 9th round of the 1969 NFL Draft. He played college football at Alcorn State University.

Owens also played for the San Diego Chargers and Houston Oilers.

References

1946 births
2013 deaths
People from Columbia, Mississippi
Players of American football from Mississippi
American football defensive ends
Alcorn State Braves football players
San Diego Chargers players
New Orleans Saints players
Houston Oilers players